Rebekah Cook Talbot (born 3 August 1986) is an English woman's international motorcycle trials rider. Rebekah is nine times British Women's Trials Champion, winning in 2004, 2005, 2006, 2007, 2008, 2009, 2011, 2012 and 2013. In 2012, she was also European Women's Trials Champion.

Biography

Cook has been competing in the British Women's Trials Championship class since 2004 and won the championship in her first year. This started a six-year run of championship wins until she finished runner-up to Gas Gas rider Joanne Coles in 2010. In 2011 Cook was back to her winning ways, repeating in 2012 and 2013 until she was beaten in 2014 by current Women's World Champion Emma Bristow. On the world scene she was runner-up in 2008, 2009 and 2010 to Laia Sanz and then again to Emma Bristow in 2014.

British Women's Trials Championship

European Women's Trials Championship

World Trials Championship

Honors

 British Women's Trials Champion 2004, 2005, 2006, 2007, 2008, 2009, 2011, 2012, 2013
 European Women's Trials Champion 2012
 British Women's Team Trial Des Nations Champion 2006, 2007, 2009, 2013, 2014, 2015, 2016

See also

 FIM Trial World Championship
 FIM Trial European Championship

References 

1986 births
Living people
People from Newport, Isle of Wight
English sportswomen
English motorcycle racers
Motorcycle trials riders
Female motorcycle racers